Panther Falls are a series of waterfalls in Banff National Park, Alberta, Canada. It is developed on Nigel Creek and its waters originate in Nigel Pass, between the slopes of Cirrus Mountain and Nigel Peak in the Parker Ridge of the Canadian Rockies.

References

Banff National Park
Waterfalls of Alberta